Artaxa vitellina is a moth of the family Erebidae first described by Vincenz Kollar in 1848. It is found in India and Sri Lanka.

The caterpillar is a minor pest of Ricinus communis.

References

External links
The Eversible Repugnatorial Scent Glands of Insects

Moths of Asia
Moths described in 1848